Lukáš Rogožan (born 1 December 1999) is a Czech footballer who currently plays as a forward for FC Zbrojovka Brno.

Club career

FC Zbrojovka Brno
He made his professional debut for Zbrojovka Brno in the home match against Vyškov on 15 October 2021, which ended in a 2–2 draw. He scored his first goal for the club in the 90th minute, equalising for 2-2.

References

External links
 Profile at FC Zbrojovka Brno official site
 Profile at FAČR official site

1999 births
Living people
Czech footballers
FC Zbrojovka Brno players
Association football midfielders
Czech Republic youth international footballers
People from Vyškov
Sportspeople from the South Moravian Region